Zuzana Blažeková (born 1 July 1980) is a Slovak racewalker. She competed in the women's 20 kilometres walk at the 2000 Summer Olympics.

References

1980 births
Living people
Athletes (track and field) at the 2000 Summer Olympics
Slovak female racewalkers
Olympic athletes of Slovakia
Place of birth missing (living people)